Kegen (Kegen) is a selo and seat of Raiymbek District in Almaty Region of south-eastern Kazakhstan. Population:

References

Populated places in Almaty Region